Paula Kania-Choduń and Katarzyna Piter were the defending champions but chose not to participate.

Kaitlyn Christian and Sabrina Santamaria won the title, defeating Hayley Carter and Luisa Stefani in the final, 7–6(7–4), 4–6, [10–5].

Seeds

Draw

Draw

References

External Links
Main Draw

2021 WTA 125 tournaments
2021 L'Open 35 de Saint-Malo – Doubles